Hu Jiali (born 2 September 1999) is a Chinese footballer who plays as a midfielder for Wuhan FC.

Career statistics

Club
.

References

1999 births
Living people
Chinese footballers
Association football midfielders
Chinese Super League players
Shanghai Port F.C. players
Shanghai Shenhua F.C. players
Dalian Professional F.C. players
Qingdao F.C. players